The Thinking Skills Assessment (TSA) is a generic admissions test, which is used as part of the admissions process for entry to some undergraduate courses at the University of Cambridge, the University of Oxford and University College London.

History
TSA was developed and is run by Cambridge Assessment Admissions Testing. It was developed to help universities assess whether applicants have the skills and aptitudes considered essential for Higher Education study. Cambridge Assessment Admissions Testing produces and distributes practice materials, including specimen questions and past papers, on their website.

The test was first introduced for undergraduate entry to the University of Cambridge in 2001 and was used as part of the admissions process for a number of undergraduate courses. It is currently used for application to the Land Economy course only.

In 2007, the University of Oxford introduced TSA as part of its admissions process for Philosophy, Politics and Economics (PPE). At this stage, the test was known as the ‘PPE Admissions Test’. The use of TSA was extended for entry to Economics and Management in 2008; to Experimental Psychology, and Psychology and Philosophy in 2009, Geography, Philosophy and Linguistics, and Psychology and Linguistics in 2012, and in 2015 to Human Sciences. Since 2016, candidates applying for Chemistry have been required to sit a version of TSA consisting of Section 1 of the test only (TSA S1), with History and Economics requiring the same from 2017. From 2018, the University of Oxford no longer required applicants to take TSA for entry to their Geography course.

Since the 2008–09 application cycle, University College London has used TSA to assist in the selection of applicants to European Social and Political Studies (ESPS).

Format
TSA consists of one or two sections, depending on the university and course being applied for. Section 2 is used in addition to Section 1 by the University of Oxford for certain courses.

 Section 1 (90 minutes): 50 multiple-choice questions testing problem solving (including numerical and spatial reasoning) and critical thinking skills (including understanding argument and reasoning using everyday language).
 Section 2 (30 minutes): Candidates must answer one essay question from a choice of four (questions are not subject specific). It tests the ability to organise ideas in a clear and concise manner, and communicate them effectively in writing.

Scoring
The multiple-choice answers (Section 1) are marked by Cambridge Assessment Admissions Testing with 1 mark available per question. Final scores are calculated to one decimal place on the TSA scale (running approximately 0–100) using the Rasch statistical technique. 
 
The writing task component of TSA (Section 2) used by the University of Oxford is reviewed by admissions tutors.

An average score is about 60, so around 28 out of 50 raw marks. If you score 70 or above, you will find yourself in the top 10 of candidates – this equates to about 38 out 50.

Timing and results

University College London
For University College London (UCL), TSA is taken during the interview stage. It is administered as a paper-based test. UCL admissions interviews are held on specific dates from December to March. Results are reported to the university only.

The University of Cambridge and The University of Oxford
For the University of Cambridge and the University of Oxford, TSA is held in late October/early November as a pre-interview, paper-based test taken at schools, colleges or authorised test centres globally. Results are issued in mid-January of the following year, via Cambridge Assessment Admissions Testing’s results online portal.

Usage
The exact use of results varies between the subjects which use the test, and candidates need to refer to their chosen course for precise details.

See also
Cambridge Assessment Admissions Testing

References

External links
 Official website

Standardized tests
University of Cambridge examinations
University of Oxford examinations
University College London
University and college admissions
Education in the United Kingdom